Bruno Tozzi (27 November 1656 - 29 January 1743) was an Italian monk, botanist and mycologist. An abbott of the Vallombrosan Order, he was a mentor for Pier Antonio Micheli who named the plant genus Tozzia in his honour. 

Tozzi was born in Montevarchi and his father Francesco di Simone Tozzi came from Florence. He was ordained in the Vallombrosan Order on May 5, 1676. He took an interest in the study of nature, travelling into the Alps and across Italy, collecting natural history specimens. Along with Pier Antonio Micheli he took an interest in the fungi and described many species with illustrations. His manuscript Sylva fungorum is preserved at the Bibliotheca Nazionale in Florence. Tozzi was elected a Fellow of the Royal Society in 1715 and corresponded with James Petiver, Hans Sloane and other naturalists of the period. He was a founder of the Società Botanica Fiorentina. He lived a solitary life as a monk and died in Vallombrosa.

References

External links 
 Brief biography

1656 births
1743 deaths
17th-century Italian botanists
Fellows of the Royal Society
People from the Province of Arezzo
Pre-Linnaean botanists
18th-century Italian botanists